Kentice Libutsuli Tikolo is a Kenyan born communications professional, a facilitator, mentor and coach. She has  experience as a scientist, communications and public relations professional, administrator and sports woman. In sports, she has become the first Kenyan woman to ever chair a board of a men’s football team.

In 2008, Tikolo was awarded the Golden Honours Award for Excellent Support in Advancing Public Relations Excellence by the Public Relations Society of Kenya. She is the Managing Director of Cause Impact, a Nairobi-based strategic PR and Communications company that she founded. She also teaches strategic PR and communications at the University of Nairobi.

Background and education 
Tikolo attended Loreto High School Limuru, Alliance Girls High between 1977 – 1983. She earned her a Bachelor’s Degree in Education (Botany and Zoology) from Kenyatta University, a Master of Public Relations Degree from University of Stirling in Scotland, and is currently pursuing a PhD at the University of Nairobi.

She played hockey in school  and in university (1984 – 1988) and for the Goan Institute in 1988, basketball (1981 - 1982), volleyball (1978 - 1983) and lawn tennis (1977 – 1980). She participated in national tennis tournaments too. She sprinted (1977 – 1980); competed in 200 metres as well as long jump. She represented her school up to national level.

Tikolo is the daughter of a sporting father who trained as a sports teacher at the Kenyatta University College and played in the Gossage Cup (as the premier football competition- CECAFA- was known at the time), with the late football legend Joe Kadenge. Her eldest son, Jeffrey Tikolo, is a footballer. He has won the footballer of the year title/most valuable player in the league, for his university at the University of Cape Town, South Africa. Her younger son, Immanuel, is also a footballer.

Privileged with the ability to blend her scientific background with the art of Public Relations & Communications, she is a hands-on and strategic consultant and manager who has executed very high level events at international level.

Career 
Tikolo started her career as an administrator before sidestepping into public relations where she went on to be Head of Corporate Communications for a large state corporation, Kenya Wildlife Service,. She re-wrote the Kenya Wildlife Service Strategic Plan 2008-2012 for simplicity, as well as the Annual Report. The Annual Report 2007 that she produced for the corporation won the top prize at the Public Relations Society of Kenya Annual Awards of that year. She has also been a part-time lecturer at the United States International University in Nairobi.

She worked in the public sector as well as international organizations, including CARE International in Kenya and the International Livestock Research Institute (ILRI), where she specialized in packaging information for diverse audiences using various communication channels such as magazines, websites, intranets, newsletters, reports, brochures and newspaper articles. At ILRIs predecessor organization- International Laboratory for Research on Animals Diseases (ILRAD), she worked as a research technician in Theileria and Trypanosomiasis where she published a paper on theileriosis.

During the International Conference on Aids and STIs in Africa (ICASA) Nairobi 2003 Conference, Tikolo was seconded by CDC to deputize the scientific coordinator. She was in charge of producing the scientific programme and ensuring its implementation and production of the final report. She planned and managed a subsequent ICASA conference that saw her win a medal from the Ethiopian government.

The Beyond Zero Campaign 
Tikolo conceptualized and led the team that executed the Kenyan First Lady's Beyond Zero campaign to end maternal and child mortality in Kenya.  The campaign was nominated for three (3) awards in the Public Relations Society of Kenya (PRSK) Excellence Awards in 2014. These were Social Campaign of the Year, Sponsorship Campaign of the Year and Not for Profit Campaign.

The Kenya First Lady made a decision to use sporting events such as the London Marathon, where she first lady participated, and created the First Lady's Half Marathon to complement the Beyond Zero Campaign. This saw the campaign provide 14 fully-kitted mobile clinics handed to county governments to boost delivery of services to mothers. The plan was to reach out to all 47 counties as a way of improving the health of women and children. Subsequently, Mrs Kenyatta was named the United Nations in Kenya Person of the Year 2014 for her efforts to stop preventable maternal and newborn deaths in the country through the Beyond Zero Campaign. She was selected for successfully raising awareness and funds to address the plight of women and children and in need of quality health care.

Tikolo has gone on to be Chairman of the Public Relations Society of Kenya (PRSK), earning the honor of Fellow, the highest membership category of the society awarded for excellent contribution. She served as Africa’s representative on the board of the Global Alliance for PR & Communication Management.

See also 

 Football in Kenya
 Kenya Premier League

External links 

 Public Relations Society of Kenya

References 

Living people
Academic staff of the University of Nairobi
Kenyatta University alumni
Alumni of the University of Stirling
University of Nairobi alumni
Year of birth missing (living people)